The stout cardinalfish (Rosenblattia robusta) is a species of deepwater cardinalfish found around the world in southern temperate waters, where it occurs at depths from .  This species can reach  in TL.  It is currently the only known member of its genus.

References

Epigonidae
Monotypic fish genera
Fish described in 1965